Kwabre District is a former district that was located in Ashanti Region of Ghana.  Originally created as an ordinary district assembly in 1988, which it was created from the former Kwabre-Sekyere District Council; until the western part of the district was split off to become the southern portion of Afigya-Kwabre District on 1 November 2007 (effectively 29 February 2008); while the remaining portion has since then been officially renamed as Kwabre East District, which it was elevated to municipal district assembly status to become Kwabre East Municipal District on 1 November 2017 (effectively 15 March 2018). The district assembly was located in the northern part of Ashanti Region and had Mamponteng as its capital town.

Sources
 
 GhanaDistricts.com

Districts of Ashanti Region